Wang Junzheng (born 17 May 1963) is a Chinese politician, serving Communist Party Secretary of Tibet since 18 October 2021. He was head of the Political and Legal Affairs Commission of Xinjiang. Between 2016 and 2019, he was the Communist Party Secretary of Changchun. Prior to his position in Changchun, he served in a variety of posts, as vice-governor of Hubei, the Party Secretary of Xiangyang, and the mayor and party chief of Lijiang.

Career
Wang was born in Linyi, Shandong. He joined the Communist Party of China in November 1987. He graduated from Shandong University in the department of social science and socialism. He earned a doctorate degree in the Marxism-Leninism college of Renmin University. He also has a doctorate in management studies from Tsinghua University.

Wang began his career in the Ministry of Labour. His first regional tenure was in Yunnan province, serving successively as the party chief of Guandu District, Kunming, the head of the Kunming Political and Legal Affairs department, the head of the municipal Organization Department, and deputy party chief. He was then named vice president of the People's High Court of Yunnan. He was then named mayor then party chief of the prefecture-level city of Lijiang.

In September 2012, he moved out of Yunnan province and was named vice governor of Hubei. In May 2013, he was named party chief of Xiangyang, then joined the provincial Party Standing Committee two months later. In January 2016, he again transferred inter-provincially to Jilin to join the provincial ruling council there and the party chief of the provincial capital Changchun. During his term in Changchun, the city received nationwide attention for the Changsheng vaccine incident, in which a local firm used expired fluids to produce rabies vaccines. On February 11, 2019, Wang was transferred to Xinjiang to serve as the head of the regional Political and Legal Affairs Commission (Zhengfawei).

On March 22, 2021 the United States Treasury Department “... unveiled new sanctions against two Chinese officials in response to ‘serious human rights abuse’ against Uighur Muslims in Xinjiang. The sanctions, which target Wang Junzheng, secretary of the Party Committee of the Xinjiang Production and Construction Corps, and Chen Mingguo, director of the Xinjiang Public Security Bureau, were rolled out in coordination with Canada and European allies.”

On 18 October 2021, he was transferred to southwest China's Tibet Autonomous Region and appointed Communist Party Secretary of Tibet, the top political position in the region.

References

1963 births
Politicians from Linyi
Living people
People's Republic of China politicians from Shandong
Chinese Communist Party politicians from Shandong
Political office-holders in Hubei
Political office-holders in Yunnan
Political office-holders in Heilongjiang
Shandong University alumni
Renmin University of China alumni
Tsinghua University alumni